Giuseppe Ciantes, O.P. (1602–1670) was a Roman Catholic prelate, hebraist and theologian who served as Bishop of Marsico Nuovo (1640–1656).

Biography
Giuseppe Ciantes was born in Rome, Italy in 1602 and ordained a priest in the Order of Preachers. He completed his studies at the Roman studium of the Dominican Order at Santa Maria sopra Minerva, which later developed into the Pontifical University of Saint Thomas Aquinas, and was professor of theology and philosophy there before 1640. He devoted himself to the study of Oriental languages, and had the opportunity of applying his knowledge of Hebrew for the conversion of the Jews, to whom Urban VIII had appointed him preacher in Rome. On 5 March 1640, he was appointed Bishop of Marsico Nuovo in the Kingdom of Naples. On 19 March 1640, he was consecrated bishop by Marcantonio Franciotti, Bishop of Lucca, with Lelio Falconieri, Titular Archbishop of Thebae, and Giovanni Battista Altieri (seniore), Bishop Emeritus of Camerino, serving as co-consecrators.  He distinguished himself by the good example which he set in his diocese. In January 1656 he resigned the episcopal functions to retire to the convent of Minerva. In 1657 Ciantes published a "monumental bilingual edition of the first three Parts of Thomas Aquinas' Summa contra Gentiles, which includes the original Latin text and a Hebrew translation prepared by Ciantes, assisted by Jewish apostates, the Summa divi Thomae Aquinatis ordinis praedicatorum Contra Gentiles quam Hebraice eloquitur…. Until the present this remains the only significant translation of a major Latin scholastic work in modern Hebrew." He died in the convent of Minerva on 24 February 1670.

Works

Episcopal succession
While bishop, he was the principal co-consecrator of:

References

External links and additional sources
 (for Chronology of Bishops) (for Chronology of Bishops) 
 (for Chronology of Bishops) (for Chronology of Bishops) 

17th-century Italian Roman Catholic bishops
Bishops appointed by Pope Urban VIII
Clergy from Rome
1602 births
1670 deaths
Christian Hebraists